LA-31 is a constituency of Azad Kashmir Legislative Assembly which is currently represented by Chaudhary Muhammad Ismail of Pakistan Muslim League (N). It covers the area of Hafizabad District Gujranwala District (except Wazirabad Tehsil) Sialkot District (except Sialkot Tehsil in Pakistan. Only refugees from Jammu and Ladakh settled in Pakistan are eligible to vote.

Election 2016

elections were held in this constituency on 21 July 2016.

Azad Kashmir Legislative Assembly constituencies